Margaret of Sweden (Norwegian: Margrete Eriksdotter; c. 1155 – 1209) was Queen of Norway as the spouse of King Sverre of Norway.

Biography
Margaret was the daughter of King Eric IX of Sweden and his Danish Queen Christina. In 1189, she married the Norwegian King Sverre. She is only sporadically mentioned in history during her tenure as queen; primarily in connection with an attempt by Nikolas Arnesson to become Bishop of Stavanger. In the sagas, Queen Margaret is portrayed as suspect and  intrigant 

She became a widow in 1202, returned to her native Sweden, and retired to her estates in Västergötland and Värmland.  Departing Norway, she had to leave her daughter Kristina Sverresdotter behind against her will. She spent two years in Sweden and returned to Norway in 1204.

On 1 January 1204, two days after she had returned to Norway, her stepson, King Haakon III of Norway, died with obvious symptoms of poisoning. Margaret became a suspect of the crime, and one of her servants tried to prove her innocence in a trial by ordeal which failed. The servant was drowned and Margareta fled back to Sweden.

Margaret returned to Norway in 1209 for her daughter's wedding.  Her daughter married co-regent Filip Simonsson, the Bagler party candidate to the throne of Norway. Margaret took part in the wedding. Immediately after the wedding she became ill, and died a few weeks later.

In popular culture

Lia Boysen portrays a fictionalized Margaret in the 2016 film The Last King. Margaret is portrayed as having an affair with a fictional Bagler aristocrat and poisons Haakon in a conspiracy to become queen again.

References

Other sources
Magerøy, H. Soga om birkebeinar og baglar  (1988)
Imsen, Steinar Våre dronninger: fra Ragnhild Eriksdatter til Sonja (Oslo: 1991)
Koht, Halvdan Norske dronningar (in "The Old Norse Sagas", 1931)

1150s births
1209 deaths
Margaret 1150
Norwegian royal consorts
House of Sverre
Fairhair dynasty
House of Eric
12th-century Swedish people
12th-century Norwegian people
13th-century Swedish people
13th-century Norwegian people
12th-century Swedish women
12th-century Norwegian women
13th-century Swedish women
13th-century Norwegian women
Daughters of kings